601 Squadron or 601st Squadron may refer to:

 No. 601 Squadron RAF, of the United Kingdom Royal Air Force
 601 Squadron (Israel), of the Israeli Air Force
 601 Squadron (Portugal), of the Portuguese Air Force
 601st Bombardment Squadron, of the United States Air Force